Cringer is a fictional large cat in the Masters of the Universe franchise. He has green and orange striped fur, similar to that of a tiger (although his species is not truly known), and is Prince Adam’s feline companion. Whenever Adam transforms into He-Man, he uses his Power Sword to transform Cringer into the much larger and mightier Battle Cat to serve primarily as his riding mount.

He-Man and the Masters of the Universe (1983-1985)

Cringer, despite being a large cat, displays characteristics more consistent with a domestic house cat. He sleeps most of the day, overeats, and gets scared very easily. He can talk, although no reason is ever given for this ability. 

He has the appearance of a green and yellow-striped tiger. In the episode "Teela's Quest", Queen Marlena says to Adam in regards to the planet Earth, "There are no talking green tigers on Earth." It is not known if her referring to Cringer as a tiger means he is called a tiger on Eternia, or if she is simply using it as a comparison, but in the episode "A Beastly Sideshow", Evil-Lyn also refers to Cringer as a tiger, and in the episode "House of Shokoti", a boy is surprised that he is "a talking tiger". It is unclear how many others are like him. 

When Prince Adam transforms into He-Man, he uses the Power Sword to shoot an energy beam at Cringer so he can become Battle Cat. Cringer hates the transformation, but he goes along with it out of loyalty to Adam. 

Battle Cat is Cringer’s polar opposite. He is twice the size of Cringer, speaks with a growl, and has a mighty roar that can be heard from afar. He also gains a suit of red armor, which includes a saddle for He-Man to ride on. He largely serves as a mount for He-Man, but is known for fighting with villains as well. Battle Cat also has a love interest in the episode "The Cat And The Spider": Kittrina, a warrior of the cat-people.

The story of Cringer/Battle Cat's past is covered in the episode "Battle Cat". The episode recounts that Adam, while on a few days exploring the jungle as a boy, heard a kitten whining in a bush and a sabrecat approaching. Concerned that the sabrecat might attack the smaller cat, Adam was able to scare the sabrecat away by using a manticore call and headed to the bush where he discovered a small green tiger cub who had been abandoned. Adam took the kitten back to the palace where it was tended to by Man-At-Arms. After it became well, Adam adopted the kitten as his pet. However the kitten was scared easily, and he and Adam were often teased by Teela and the other children in Eternia, who took to calling him a "cringer" because of his fear causing him to cringe at everything he saw. Although Adam defended his pet, he agreed with calling him Cringer because it was appropriate for the little cat as he was afraid of his own shadow. The Sorceress appeared and told Adam that Cringer might bring him embarrassment now, but in the future he would be useful.

Years passed, and after Adam was given the ability to become He-Man, he usually performed the transformation out of sight of Cringer who, even though he had grown to normal tiger size, was still afraid of just about everything. This all changed at an archaeological dig that Adam and Teela went on with Man-At-Arms, with Cringer in tow because he did not want to leave Adam's side. They inadvertently broke open a door releasing a monster, and to attempt to stop the monster Adam transformed into He-Man. Unbeknownst to him, Cringer was watching the entire transformation and ran away to hide. A now-transformed He-Man tried to reassure Cringer that he was still the same person, just with superpowers. However, as he was doing so, he accidentally pointed his still-energized sword at Cringer, who was quivering with fear at the sight. A beam of energy shot out of the sword and hit the cat, which caused Cringer to double in size, develop his loud roar, growling voice, and a newfound sense of courage, and be outfitted with his red armor for the first time. He-Man was surprised to see the change in the usually timid cat, but remembered the Sorceress' words from when he was a child; he then received another message, telling him Battle Cat was now his partner. Using Battle Cat, he was able to confine the beast and save the endangered team. This version of Battle Cat can be seen with He-Man in a MetLife commercial that aired in 2012.

Masters of the Universe vs. The Snakemen (2002)

In the 2002 remake of the He-Man animated series, Cringer is somewhat different as he does not speak, communicating more like a typical domestic cat as opposed to a talking tiger, and serves more as a pet to Adam. He is still cowardly, although this does not come up as much as in the original series, but more than once he has shown some bravery in order to help Adam. As Battle Cat, he is most often seen merely transporting He-Man and roaring loudly. However, while in the first season he only has a few moments where he fights, in season 2 the writers gave him a more active role; he often fights against the Snake Men and Skeletor's forces. Since he never speaks, there seems to be an effort to portray his relationship with Adam/He-Man as more than master/pet, most often through either Battle Cat or Cringer being badly injured and He-Man entering a rage, or by He-Man explaining things to him.

He is twice seen without his battle helmet, revealing a rather fiercer and saber-toothed version of Cringer's face beneath. In the episode "The Power of Grayskull", King Grayskull was shown to have his own mount, albeit more lion-like and with a mane, who stayed by his side until his death.

Origin
In The Toys That Made Us, then-marketing VP of Mattel Paul Cleveland recounts the story that while the decision was made for He-Man to have some sort of vehicle, they no longer had the budget to be able to produce one; the decision was then made to repurpose a tiger from the Big Jim toy line. The tiger was, however, not the same scale as the He-Man figure, and compared to He-Man, was about the size of a horse. Cleveland, however, insisted it to be used, even after artist Tony Guerrero made a green version in an attempt to discourage Cleveland, who instead approved of the color change and suggested putting a saddle on it, which resulted in Battle Cat's final design.

Powers and abilities
Cringer is strong enough to carry Adam on his back if he is unable to walk or being unconscious. When he transforms into Battle Cat, his size and bravery are amplified. He would not hesitate to defend He-Man with his own life from any danger.

Sculpture
A life-size model of Battle Cat was part of the 2012 Go Safari exhibition, in Northampton, and titled Taxi for Adam (a reference to He-Man's alter ego, Prince Adam). The figure was sculptured by Rory Davis and painted by Ross White. The sculpture was the sixth in the series of "Go Safari" animals and was initially placed in Wood Hill (near County Hall). Following some naked revelers sitting on the sculpture, and minor vandalism, it was moved to the courtyard of the Northampton Guildhall. The sculpture was removed at the end of the public art project on 2 September 2012.
He was then owned by Mike Hatherall from South Wales before selling him on to be displayed in Camden at the famous Monkey's Emporium

References

Animal superheroes
Masters of the Universe Heroic Warriors
Fictional characters who can move at superhuman speeds
Fictional characters with superhuman durability or invulnerability
Fictional characters with superhuman senses
Fictional characters with superhuman strength
Fictional shapeshifters
Fictional tigers
Fictional anthropomorphic characters
Fictional characters introduced in 1983
Male characters in animated series
Fictional familiar spirits
Talking animals in fiction